Campi is a commune in the Haute-Corse department of France on the island of Corsica.

Administration
Campi is part of the canton of Ghisonaccia, together with 19 other communes.

Geography
The village has beautiful old houses.

Population

See also
Communes of the Haute-Corse department

References

Communes of Haute-Corse